4n + 2 may refer to:

Singly even number, a number of the form 4n + 2 for an integer n
Hückel's rule in organic chemistry, also known as the 4n + 2 rule